The following list of glam metal bands and artists includes bands and artists that have been described as glam metal or its interchangeable terms, hair metal, hair bands, pop metal and lite metal by professional journalists at some stage in their career. Glam metal is a subgenre of heavy metal and is influenced by 1970s glam rock. Glam metal groups wear "flashy clothing, heavy makeup, and large, teased hair".

Glam metal bands and artists

A

Accept (Eat the Heat era)
Aerosmith
Alias
Alien
Autograph

B

Babylon A.D.
Sebastian Bach
Bad Company (1986–1990)
Bad English
Bad4Good
Badlands
Bang Tango
Barren Cross
Bangalore Choir
Beggars & Thieves
Nuno Bettencourt
Bitch (as Betsy)
Black 'n Blue
Blackfoot (Siogo era)
Blonz
Bloodgood
Blue Murder
Bon Jovi
Bonham
Bonfire
Bride
Brighton Rock
Britny Fox
BulletBoys

C

Candy Harlots
Celtic Frost (Cold Lake era)
Child's Play
Cinderella
Circus of Power
Contraband
Alice Cooper (late '80s/early '90s work)
David Coverdale
Cry Wolf
The Cult (Electric and Sonic Temple)
Cycle Sluts from Hell

D

D.A.D.
Damn Yankees
Danger Danger
Dangerous Toys
Def Leppard
Dirty Looks
Discharge (Grave New World era)
D'Molls
Dokken

E

Easy Action
Electric Boys
Enuff Z'Nuff
Europe
Every Mother's Nightmare
Extreme
Ezo

F

Faster Pussycat
Fastway
Femme Fatale
FireHouse
Lita Ford
Frehley's Comet

G

Giant
Giuffria
Gorky Park (early work)
Gotthard
Great White
Guardian
Guns N' Roses

H

Sammy Hagar
Halloween
Hanoi Rocks
Hardline
Harem Scarem
Heart (1985–1990)
Heaven's Edge
Helix
Hollywood Rose
Holy Soldier
Honeymoon Suite
House of Lords
Hurricane

I

Icon
It's Alive

J

Jackyl
Jetboy
Johnny Crash
Jon Bon Jovi
John Norum
Judas Priest (Turbo era)
Junkyard

K

Keel
Kick Axe
Kik Tracee
Killer Dwarfs
King Kobra
Kingdom Come
Kiss
Kix
Krokus (80s work)

L

L.A. Guns
Leviticus
Legs Diamond
Lillian Axe
Lion
Little Caesar
Living Colour (Vivid era)
Lizzy Borden
London
Lord Tracy
Loudness
Love/Hate
Lynch Mob

M

Madam X
Magdallan
Yngwie Malmsteen
Manic Street Preachers (Generation Terrorists era)
Bret Michaels
Michael Monroe
Mötley Crüe
Montrose (Mean era)
Mr. Big

N

Nasty Idols
Vince Neil
Nelson
Night Ranger
Nitro
Ted Nugent (Penetrator era)
The Nymphs

O
 Odin
Osmi Putnik
Ozzy Osbourne

P

Pantera (80s work)
Poison
Pretty Boy Floyd
Pretty Maids
 Phantom Blue

Q

Queensrÿche
Quiet Riot
The Quireboys

R

Ratt
Return
Rock City Angels
Axl Rose
David Lee Roth
Rough Cutt
Roxx Gang

S

Sacred Warrior
Saigon Kick
Scorpions
Sea Hags
Shark Island
Paul Shortino
Shotgun Messiah
Shout
Skid Row
Mike Slamer
Slaughter
Mark Slaughter
Sleeze Beez
Sleze
Slik Toxik
Smashed Gladys
Sons of Angels
SouthGang
Spinal Tap
Spread Eagle
Stage Dolls
Steeler
Steelheart
Stryken
Stryper

T

Takara (Eternal Faith era)
Tempest
Tesla
Thor
Thunder
Tigertailz
TNT
Tokyo Blade (Ain't Misbehavin' era)
Tora Tora
Treat
T-Ride
Triumph (Thunder Seven era)
Trixter
T.S.O.L.
Tuff
Twisted Sister
Tyketto
Steven Tyler

U

Ugly Kid Joe
Uriah Heep (Equator era)

V

Vain
Van Halen
Vanadium (late 80s work)
Vandal
Vandenberg (Alibi era)
Vinnie Vincent Invasion
Vixen

W

War Babies
Warlock
Warrant
W.A.S.P.
Whitecross
Whitesnake
White Lion
White Tiger
Winger
Kip Winger
Winter Rose
Wrathchild

X

X Japan
X-Sinner
XYZ

Y
Y&T (1984–1990)

Z
Zebra

Glam metal revival bands

Bad City
Bang Camaro
Black Veil Brides
Blessed by a Broken Heart
Brain Donor
Brides of Destruction
Crashdïet
Crazy Lixx
The Darkness
The Datsuns
Diamond Nights
Diemonds
Dirty Penny
Falling in Reverse
Hardcore Superstar
H.E.A.T
Hinder
The Last Vegas
Lynam
Orgy
Papa Roach (Metamorphosis era)
The Poodles
Reckless Love
Santa Cruz
Satanicide
Seventh Key
Steel Panther
Towers of London
We Are Harlot

See also
List of heavy metal bands
List of glam metal albums and songs
List of glam rock artists

Notes

References

 
Glam metal